The 1891 Princeton Tigers football team represented Princeton University in the 1891 college football season. The team finished with a 12–1 record. The Tigers recorded 12 shutouts and outscored opponents by a combined total of 391 to 0 in their first 12 games. The team's sole loss was in the final game of the season by a 19–0 score against Yale.

Three Princeton players, quarterback Philip King, fullback Sheppard Homans, Jr., and guard Jesse Riggs, were consensus first-team honorees on the 1891 College Football All-America Team.

Schedule

References

Princeton
Princeton Tigers football seasons
Princeton Tigers football